Simiza may refer to:

 Simiza people, or Chimila, an ethnic group of Colombia
 Simiza language, or Chimila, a language of Colombia
 Simiza, Greece, a community in Tragano, Greece

See also 
 Simizu (disambiguation)